Audiomack is an on-demand music streaming and audio discovery platform that allows artists and creators to upload limitless music and podcasts for listeners through its mobile apps and website. In February 2021, Billboard announced Audiomack streaming data would begin informing some of its flagship charts, including the Hot 100, the Billboard 200, and the Global 200. In March 2021, Fast Company magazine named Audiomack one of the 10 most innovative companies in music.

History 
Co-founded in 2012 by Dave Macli, David Ponte, and Brian Zisook, Audiomack allowed artists to freely share their mixtapes, songs, and albums. In April 2013, J. Cole (Yours Truly 2) and Chance the Rapper (Acid Rap) released new projects exclusively on the platform. In September 2018, Eminem released "Killshot", a diss track about Machine Gun Kelly, exclusively on Audiomack and gained 8.6 million plays in four months. In February, 2019, Nicki Minaj released three songs exclusively on the platform, including a remix of Blueface's "Thotiana."

In November 2020, Audiomack signed a music licensing agreement with Warner Music Group, covering the United States, Canada, Jamaica, and five "key African territories," including Ghana, Kenya, Nigeria, South Africa, and Tanzania. In February 2021, Variety reported Audiomack has music licensing agreements in the United States with Universal Music Group and Sony Music Entertainment. Audiomack also receives music through licensing deals with labels and distributors such as 300 and EMPIRE, among others, and manages rights through its relationship with Songtrust.

In December 2020, Audiomack opened its monetization program, AMP, to all eligible creators based in the United States, Canada, and the United Kingdom. In July 2021, Audiomack expanded the program to creators worldwide and introduced a partnership with Ziiki Media to help promote artists across Africa.

In December 2021, Audiomack launched Supporters, a "feature that will enable loyal fans to tip their favorite artist’s music." Fans fund artists or rights holders directly by purchasing ‘support badges’ for individual song and album releases. Warner Music Group, which was Audiomack's first major label partner, signed on as the first major label participant in "Supporters." Other participating partners include Amuse, AudioSalad Direct, DistroKid, EMPIRE, FUGA, Stem, and Vydia.

Audiomack reaches more than 20 million monthly users globally, as of December 2021.

Features 
Offline playback is free to all users and not blocked by a paywall. Users and artists can upload their music to the service through its website. Audiomack uses a combination of audio fingerprinting, DMCA takedown requests, and manual curation to police unauthorized sharing. Audiomack does not limit or charge creators for storing content on its service.

In April 2021, Audiomack partnered with telecommunications company MTN Nigeria to offer its users cheaper data to stream music in its app.

In February 2023, Audiomack penned  down a partnership deal with MTV Base to improve listeners’ access to quality music material while raising awareness of African musicians throughout Africa.

Content 
Audiomack produces several original video content series, including Trap Symphony, with past episodes including Migos, Chief Keef, and Rich the Kid, among others. Other series include Bless The Booth and Fine Tuned, which has featured YNW Melly and others. In March 2021, Audiomack officially launched Audiomack World, the editorial arm of the company. Users can read articles in the Audiomack app on Android and iOS, as well as their desktop site.

Ambassadors
Audiomack has had a number of ambassadors. The list of African ambassadors includes:
 Jade Kelly Wilson, South Africa
 Shadrack Kisame, Uganda
 Mohamed Sanago aka Yung Baller, Sierra Leone
 Eloi Mugabe, Rwanda/Burundi
 Eva Ndumbe, Cameroon
 Abel Zedi, Kenya
 Fizzy Obop, Nigeria
 Maxwell Adjavon, Ghana
 Nova Amandla, Zambia
 Habibou Niang aka El habib, Senegal
 Ackim Ndolo, Tanzania

See also 
 Music websites
 Streaming music services

References

Streaming media systems
2012 establishments
Digital audio distributors
Internet properties established in 2012
American music websites